Grand Central Terminal is a major commuter rail terminal in Midtown Manhattan, New York City, serving the Metro-North Railroad's Harlem, Hudson and New Haven Lines. It is the most recent of three functionally similar buildings on the same site. The current structure was built by and named for the New York Central Railroad, though it also served New York Central's successors as well as the New York, New Haven and Hartford Railroad.

19th century

  –

20th century

21st century

See also
 History of Grand Central Terminal
 History of New York City

References

Further reading

General references

External links
 Grand by Design, a New York Transit Museum website and exhibition on the terminal's history

Timeline
Grand Central Terminal
New York Central Railroad
Metro-North Railroad
Grand Central Terminal